Manorama is a 2009 Telugu-language film, directed by Eshwar Reddy, with music by Koti, starring Charmy Kaur and Nishan in lead roles. Comic actor Ali also made some funny scenes in the movie.

Plot
The story begins with Gitanjali, a k a Gilli (Charmy Kaur), who comes to Hyderabad to spend a few days with her friends (Lahari and Sridhar). She lives near Manorama café and there comes a stranger (Nishan) with a bag. His motive is to detonate a bomb in the café, meanwhile Gilli is bored and wants to kill time. With her lip reading skills, she figures out from a distance that a boy is threatening to commit suicide on phone to his girlfriend. Gilli becomes the angel, also notices the number with her abilities and calls up that girl. She comes to Manorama to inform the lover boy, but instead the bomber sees her and falls for her. A few twists of events happen and the bomb also fails to explode on time. Meanwhile, both the stranger and Gilli get to know each other and in no time, they fall in love with each other though they don't admit it. What happens from there forms the rest of the story.

Cast
 Charmy Kaur as Geetanajali "Gilli"
 Nishan as the stranger, killer
 Lahari
 Sridhar
 Dheer Charan Srivastav
 Ali

Soundtrack
 
 "Life Ante Enjoy" (04:41), Artist(s): Madhumita, Lyricist: Venigalla Rambabu
 "Hyderabad Antene" (04:06), Artist(s): Srikanth, Murali, Baby Sahithi, Masterji, Venkat, Siva, Venugopal, Lyricist: Masterji
 "Idivarakeragani E Kadha" (07:43), Artist(s): Koti, Geetha Madhuri, Lyricist: Venigalla Rambabu
 "Swarganiki Short Route" (04:33), Artist(s): Sri Krishna, Raghuram, Hanuman Murali, Srikanth, Sudha Krishna, Lyricist: Venigalla Rambabu
 "Idivarakeragani E Kadha" (Pathos) (01:15), Artist(s): Usha, Lyricist: Venigalla Rambabu

References

External links

2000s Telugu-language films
2009 films
Films set in Hyderabad, India